Smoketown is an unincorporated community in Franklin County, in the U.S. state of Pennsylvania.

History
A variant name was "Smoke Town". In 1878, Smoketown had about 75 inhabitants.

References

Unincorporated communities in Franklin County, Pennsylvania
Unincorporated communities in Pennsylvania